Kissei Pharmaceutical is a pharmaceutical company based in Matsumoto, Nagano, Japan. Products discovered or developed by Kissei include:
 Difelikefalin
 Fostamatinib (trade name Tavalisse)
 Linzagolix
 Mitiglinide (Glufast)
 Remogliflozin etabonate
 Silodosin (Urief)
 Tranilast (Rizaben)
In March 2020, Kissei and CG Oncology, Inc. announced an exclusive license, development, and commercialization agreement for CG's oncolytic immumotherapy drug CG0070. The agreement covered Japan, South Korea, Taiwan, and other Asian countries, but not China.

References

Pharmaceutical companies of Japan
Companies based in Nagano Prefecture